"Love Screw" is MAX's 26th single on the Avex Trax label.

Track list

Charts
Oricon Sales Chart (Japan)

References

2003 singles
MAX (band) songs
2003 songs
Avex Trax singles